St James's Church in Luffincott, Devon, England was built in the 15th century. It is recorded in the National Heritage List for England as a designated Grade I listed building, and is now a redundant church in the care of the Churches Conservation Trust.  It was declared redundant on 1 May 1975, and was vested in the Trust on 19 December 1979.

Some parts of the church are the original mediaeval structure however the tower was rebuilt in 1791 as part of a wider renovation.

The interior includes Georgian sash windows and a simple 14th century granite font.

See also
 List of churches preserved by the Churches Conservation Trust in South West England

References

15th-century church buildings in England
Church of England church buildings in Devon
Grade I listed churches in Devon
Churches preserved by the Churches Conservation Trust